Brynley Francis Roberts  (born 1931), known as Bryn Roberts, is a Welsh scholar and critic, who has written much on the Welsh language and Celtic history. He was Professor of Welsh Language and Literature at the University of Wales, Swansea 1978–1985 and Librarian of the National Library of Wales in 1985–1994, then made editor of the Dictionary of Welsh Biography in 1987 and of Y Traethodydd in 1999. He is on the council of the Honourable Society of Cymmrodorion and involved in the Morfa Chapel, Aberystwyth, part of the Presbyterian Church of Wales.

Bibliography

As author
Edward Lhuyd (G.J. Williams Memorial Lecture), University of Wales Press, 14 February 1980
Brut Tysilio, University of Wales Press, December 1980
Gerald of Wales (Writers of Wales), University of Wales Press, 1982
Studies on Middle Welsh Literature, Edwin Mellen Press Ltd, 1992
Cyfannu'r rhwyg: Hanes Eglwys Salem Aberystwyth 1893-1988, Capel y Morfa, 1995
Darlith Goffa Henry Lewis: Cadrawd - Arloeswr Llên Gwerin, University of Wales, Swansea, March 1997
Ar Drywydd Edward Lhuyd: Darlith Flynyddol Edward Lhuyd, Y Coleg Cymraeg Cenedlaethol and The Learned Society of Wales, October 2013

As editor
Gwassanaeth Meir, University of Wales Press, 1961
Brut Y Brenhinedd: Llanstephan MS 1 Version (Mediaeval & Modern Welsh), Dublin Institute for Advanced Studies, December 1971
Cyfranc Lludd a Llefelys (Mediaeval & Modern Welsh), Dublin Institute for Advanced Studies, 1975
Early Welsh Poetry: Studies in the Book of Aneirin, National Library of Wales, 1988
The Arthur of the Welsh: Arthurian Legend in Mediaeval Welsh Literature, edited with Rachel Bromwich and A. O. H. Jarman, University of Wales Press, 1993; new edition 1995
Beirdd a Thywysogion: Barddoniaeth Llys yng Nghymru, Iwerddon a'r Alban, with Morfydd E. Owen, University of Wales Press, 1996
Moelwyn: Bardd Y Ddinas Gadarn , Gwasg Pantycelyn, 1996
The Dictionary of Welsh Biography 1941-1970, edited with R. T. Jenkins and E. D. Jones, Anrhydeddus Gymdeithas y Cymmrodorion, 2001
Archaeologia Britannica: Texts and Translations, author Edward Lhuyd, edited with D. Wyn Evans, Celtic Studies Publications, 2007

References

Full bibliography to 1997 by Huw Walters, Llyfryddiaeth Dr Brynley F. Roberts, J. E. Caerwyn Williams, ed., Ysgrifau Beirniadol, XXII, Denbigh: Gwasg Gee, 1997, pp. 22–40

Academics of Swansea University
Celtic studies scholars
Commanders of the Order of the British Empire
Fellows of the Learned Society of Wales
Living people
Welsh scholars and academics
Welsh literary critics
Welsh writers
1931 births